David Robert Holmes (born March 14, 1971) is an American actor, writer, television host, podcaster, producer, and former VJ who gained national attention as the runner-up on MTV's first Wanna Be a VJ contest in 1998. From the beginning, he distinguished himself from other candidates with an encyclopedic knowledge of music trivia.

Early life
Born in New Jersey and raised in St. Louis, Holmes's family includes parents Charles and Mary Lou and two older brothers, Dan and Steve. The family runs a financial consulting business in Clayton, Missouri, a St. Louis suburb. Holmes attended Villa Duchesne and Oak Hill School, the Saint Louis Priory School and the College of the Holy Cross in Worcester, Massachusetts, where he worked at WCHC, the campus radio station, and interned at WCCA-TV, Worcester's public access television station.

Career
Despite his loss to Jesse Camp, MTV hired Holmes as a VJ shortly after Wanna Be a VJ. He went on to host several MTV shows, including 120 Minutes, Video Clichés, a Real World reunion special, and the popular Say What? Karaoke until 2001. He also was a co-host and substitute host on Total Request Live. His MTV career lasted about three years longer than Camp's.

After leaving MTV in 2002, Holmes hosted FX's weekly movie night DVD on TV for 10 seasons, and Court TV's Saturday Night Solution for six. He also hosted CBS's reality comedy series Fire Me Please in 2005. On July 7, 2007, he co-hosted Bravo's coverage of the Live Earth concerts with Karen Duffy. He also appeared on a variety of talking-head shows for VH1, E!, Tru TV on BBC. Holmes had a recurring role as "Leslie Frost" on Comedy Central's Reno 911!

Holmes came out as a gay man in Out magazine in 2002. On September 23, 2010, Holmes contributed a video to the "It Gets Better" project, spearheaded by advice columnist and gay rights activist Dan Savage.

He has been an editor-at-large for Esquire since 2015. Currently, he is the host of the LGBTQ-themed Earwolf podcast Homophilia, which Entertainment Weekly called "thoughtful and charming." He also hosts the Maximum Fun comedy quiz show Troubled Waters (formerly International Waters), and, along with musician Mike Doughty, the Real World–themed Feral Audio podcast Truu Stowray. He also appeared in a series of commercials for Ford Motor Company.

Since 2003, Holmes has co-hosted the live comedy game show The Friday Forty with The Walking Dead executive producer Scott M. Gimple. He is also an on-air personality on the SiriusXM music channel The Spectrum.

On 28 June 28 2016, Penguin Random House's Crown Archetype imprint published Holmes' nonfiction book Party of One: A Memoir in 21 Songs. The memoir chronicles Holmes's experiences coming to self-acceptance during adolescence and early adulthood, with popular music as a guide and backdrop, from the 1980s through the present day. Kirkus Reviews has described it as "a hilarious and touching coming-of-age story that will strike a particular nerve among Generation Y."<ref>[https://www.kirkusreviews.com/book-reviews/dave-holmes/party-of-one-memoir/ Review of Party of One: A Memoir in 21 Songs, by Dave Holmes, April 30th, 2016.]</ref>

In October 2021, he created and hosted the 10-episode limited series podcast Waiting for Impact which traces the history of the band Sudden Impact and explores fame in the early 1990s music industry.
As of 2022 he is still an Editor at Large for Esquire. He has a show on Very Local called In Transit, where he talks with celebrities about their experiences traveling on the road.

Personal life
Holmes has been in a long-term relationship with musician Ben Wise since the early 2000s.

Filmography

FilmPillowfighter (2002, as Blindfolded Man)Fantastic Four (2005, as Reporter)You Owe Us. (2006, as Billy)Reno 911!: Miami (2007, as Persnickety Desk Worker)Promotion (2008)Atomic Zoo: Sylvia Plath Car Wash (2010, as Cake Boy)Hell Baby (2013, as Rental Car Guy)Contracted (2013, as Therapist)You or a Loved One (2014)Framing Britney Spears - The New York Times Presents S01E06 (2021, as self)

TelevisionTotal Request LiveSay What? KaraokeSpankin' New Music Week (2000)Kidnapped (2000, as Host)Fire Me... Please (2005, as Host, 3 episodes)Reno 911! (2004-2009, as Leslie Frost)Self Storage (2010-2011, as Chad)Kroll Show (2013, as Day Foams)Ben and Kate (2013, as Casting Director)FX Movie Download'' (2013, as Host)

References

External links
Official Dave Holmes Website

1971 births
American television personalities
Male television personalities
LGBT people from Missouri
American gay actors
American gay musicians
Living people
VJs (media personalities)
Male actors from St. Louis
College of the Holy Cross alumni
Schools of the Sacred Heart alumni
21st-century American male actors
21st-century LGBT people
American game show hosts